Alice Belle Garrigus (August 2, 1858 in Rockville, Connecticut – August 30, 1949 in Clarke's Beach, Newfoundland) was a Pentecostal evangelist and a founder of the Pentecostal church in Newfoundland and Labrador.

She spent the first half of her life in various locations in New England; she studied at Mount Holyoke Female Seminary (later Mount Holyoke College) and worked as a school teacher. She was raised an Episcopalian, later joined the Congregational Church, which she served for a time as an itinerant preacher, and in 1907 converted to Pentecostalism. She resumed preaching, and over the next couple of years received, she claimed, messages from "mysterious strangers" and directly from God that she should found a mission in St. John's.

Together with a missionary couple, she travelled to Newfoundland, arriving in St. John's in December 1910. The three established the "Bethesda Mission" and began their work in 1911. In 1912, her co-preachers left Newfoundland for health reasons, leaving Garrigus in charge.

The Pentecostal movement grew quite slowly during its first decade. Garrigus, not known for her organizational strengths, did not expand the movement outside the St. John's area. The main thrusts of her preaching were personal salvation through Christ, and his imminent, apocalyptic return to Earth.

After a crusade in 1919 by the evangelist Victoria Booth-Clibborn Demarest, interest in Pentecostalism increased. New converts started their own personal missions, and one of these, Robert C. English, eventually became co-pastor with Garrigus of the Bethesda Mission. The Pentecostal Assemblies of Newfoundland was incorporated in 1925. Garrigus subsequently joined forces with Eugene Vaters, a Pentecostal pastor who had once studied for the Methodist ministry. This led to Vaters replacing English as the head of the movement.

Alice Garrigus remained in Newfoundland for the rest of her life and continued to be a principal figure in the Pentecostal church.

References
 Garrigus, Alice Belle, Walking in the King's Highway
 Janes, Burton K. History of the Pentecostal Assemblies of Newfoundland
 Janes, Burton K. The Lady Who Came: The biography of Alice Belle Garrigus, Newfoundland's first Pentecostal Pioneer, Volume One (1858-1908)
 Janes, Burton K. The Lady Who Stayed: The biography of Alice Belle Garrigus, Newfoundland's first Pentecostal Pioneer, Volume Two (1908-49)
 Milley, David P., A Study of the Pentecostal Assemblies of Newfoundland's Message of Separation, Doctor of Ministry thesis, Providence Theological Seminary, 1999.
 Piper, Liza, The Pentecostal Assemblies of Newfoundland
 Rollmann, Hans, Indigenization and Cultural Participation of the Newfoundland Pentecostal Movement

1858 births
1949 deaths
Newfoundland and Labrador religious figures
Canadian Pentecostal pastors
Converts to Pentecostal denominations
Former Anglicans
Former Congregationalists
American emigrants to Canada
People from Rockville, Connecticut
Mount Holyoke College alumni